Ectoedemia leucothorax is a moth of the family Nepticulidae. It is only known from the Costa del Sol in Spain.

The wingspan is 5.2–6 mm. Adults are on wing from May to early July.

The host plant unknown, but most likely it consists of evergreen Quercus. They mine the leaves of their host plant.

External links
Fauna Europaea
A Taxonomic Revision Of The Western Palaearctic Species Of The Subgenera Zimmermannia Hering And Ectoedemia Busck s.str. (Lepidoptera, Nepticulidae), With Notes On Their Phylogeny

Nepticulidae
Moths of Europe
Moths described in 1985